The Riesending cave is a pit cave in the Untersberg near Berchtesgaden, Germany and Salzburg, Austria. At 1,148 m it is the deepest and at 19,300 m the longest cave in Germany. It was discovered in 1996. In June 2014 it became well known because of a large effort to rescue a lead speleologist.

Description
The Riesending cave (German for "huge thing") is a pit cave in the Untersberg, near Berchtesgaden, Bavaria. At 23,800 m it is the longest and 1,148 m the deepest in Germany.
Riesending was discovered in 1996 by Hermann Sommer and Ulrich Meyer.

In June 2014, Riesending became well known to the general public for the largest ever rescue effort, the rescue in the Riesending cave, taking eleven days by 700 members of a multinational group of cave rescuers to rescue then-52-year-old , one of the original and principal researchers of the cave, a physicist, speleologist and cave rescuer himself, who had been injured in a rockfall deep in the cave.

See also

 Schellenberg ice cave

References

Further reading

External links 

 Description of the cave Website of the Arbeitsgemeinschaft für Höhlenforschung, Bad Cannstatt e.V.
 "La grotte de Riesending - Descente au fond du gouffre" / "Das Riesending - 20.000 Meter unter der Erde"  by Freddie Röckenhaus - Arte.tv in French and German. In the wake of five speleologists, an exploration of the deepest and longest cave in Germany. Spectacular and immersive.[91 min]

Caves of Germany
Berchtesgaden Alps